José Luis Liso Marín (1934/5 – 27 June 2021) was a Spanish politician who served as a Senator.

References

1930s births
2021 deaths
Union of the Democratic Centre (Spain) politicians
Members of the 3rd Senate of Spain
Members of the 4th Senate of Spain
Members of the 5th Senate of Spain
Members of the 6th Senate of Spain
Mayors of places in Castile and León
People from Soria